Ruben De Fuentes (also known as Ruben Raven, born March 15, 1953) is an American musician best known as a replacement guitarist for Steppenwolf from 1979–1980 and Blue Cheer.  With the Hollywood Stars, he also recorded the original versions of "King of the Night time World" and "Escape", later released by Kiss and Alice Cooper, respectively.

References

1953 births
American heavy metal guitarists
American male songwriters
Living people
Steppenwolf (band) members
Blue Cheer members
20th-century American guitarists
American male guitarists